La Gare Lisch is an abandoned train station designed by architect Juste Lisch in Asnières-sur-Seine, France, immediately northwest of Paris. It was originally built in 1878 near the site of the Eiffel Tower to serve the third Parisian world's fair, called Exposition Universelle. It was moved to its current site in 1897.

References

Defunct railway stations in Paris
Relocated buildings and structures
Railway stations opened in 1878
1878 establishments in France
World's fair architecture in Paris
Exposition Universelle (1878)